Tim Taylor (born February 6, 1969) is a Canadian former professional ice hockey centre/left winger who played in the National Hockey League (NHL), and is now the director of player development for the St. Louis Blues of the NHL. As a player, Taylor won two Stanley Cup championships, one with the Detroit Red Wings in 1997 and another with the Tampa Bay Lightning in 2004.

Playing career
Taylor grew up playing minor hockey in his hometown of Stratford, Ontario in the OMHA. He was drafted by the  London Knights of the Ontario Hockey League (OHL) in the 16th round (230th overall) in 1986. Taylor did not initially report to the Knights for the following season, and remained at home playing Jr.B. for the Stratford Cullitons of the MWJHL. After considering an option to play in the NCAA, Taylor reported to the Knights in January 1987.

Taylor was drafted in the 2nd round, 36th overall by the Washington Capitals in the 1988 NHL Entry Draft.

On September 6, 2006, Taylor was named captain of the Tampa Bay Lightning.

On September 6, 2007, Taylor had surgery to correct hip dysplasia, effectively benching him for the 2007–08 NHL season. He retired following the 2007–08 season.

Taylor was nicknamed "The Toolman" throughout his career due to sharing his name with Tim Allen's character on the TV series Home Improvement.

Personal life
Currently Taylor lives in Stratford, Ontario with his wife and two children, Wyatt and Brittany. His brother Chris is also a professional hockey player.

Career statistics

References

External links

1969 births
Living people
Baltimore Skipjacks players
Boston Bruins players
Canadian ice hockey centres
Detroit Red Wings players
Hamilton Canucks players
Ice hockey people from Ontario
London Knights players
New York Rangers players
St. Louis Blues executives
Sportspeople from Stratford, Ontario
Stanley Cup champions
Tampa Bay Lightning players
Washington Capitals draft picks